The Southborough Committee, referred to at the time as the Franchise Committee, was one of three British committees which sat in India from 1918 to 1919, including also the Committee on Home Administration and the Feetham Function Committee.
 
The committee was chaired by Francis Hopwood, 1st Baron Southborough, and recommended:

References

Government agencies established in 1918
1919 disestablishments
1918 in India
1919 in India